Taimingasa is a genus of flowering plants belonging to the family Asteraceae.

Its native range is Northeastern China to Korea, Japan.

Species:

Taimingasa amagiensis 
Taimingasa firma 
Taimingasa yatabei

References

Asteraceae
Asteraceae genera